Andriy Yuriyovych Yefremov (born 15 February 1993) is a Ukrainian football player who plays for Chaika Petropavlivska Borshchahivka.

Club statistics

Updated to games played as of 19 October 2014.

References
 
 HLSZ
 

1993 births
Living people
Footballers from Kyiv
Ukrainian footballers
Association football midfielders
Szombathelyi Haladás footballers
Nemzeti Bajnokság I players
Ukrainian expatriate footballers
Expatriate footballers in Hungary
Ukrainian expatriate sportspeople in Hungary
Expatriate footballers in Slovakia
Ukrainian expatriate sportspeople in Slovakia
FC Hirnyk-Sport Horishni Plavni players
Ukrainian First League players